The Cape Forchu Lighthouse is located in Cape Forchu, Nova Scotia. The lighthouse is located 11 km from Yarmouth, Nova Scotia.

History
The lighthouse was constructed in 1839 and was operational in 1840. The original station was demolished in 1961 and replaced in 1962 with the "apple core" tower. Since 2000, the original Fresnel lens used at the lighthouse is located at the Yarmouth County Museum.

The surrounding  of rocky headland contain the Leif Erikson Park, which offers a scenic walking trail with ocean views.

On June 1, 2000, it became the first operating light station in Canadian history to be transferred to a municipality from the Department of Fisheries and Oceans, through the Department's Alternative Use Program. In exchange for the delivery of services it was transferred to the Municipality of the District of Yarmouth for one dollar. It became a registered Heritage property of the Municipality in 2001 and of the Province of Nova Scotia in 2003.

Current day 
The 19 acres of ground the lighthouse is on is open to the public year-round. The light keeper's house is a Heritage property that is open from May to September and houses The Keeper's Kitchen restaurant and a gift shop.

In 2018, The Lighthouse, a feature film starring Willem Dafoe and Robert Pattinson, was filmed in the park.

The original lighthouse, demolished in 1961, was featured on a postage stamp in 2022, one of five Vintage Travel Posters stamps issued on June 9. The stamps had been planned for release in 2020, but were twice delayed due to the Covid-19 pandemic. The stamp shows the old lighthouse as it appears on a 1950 poster designed by Peter Ewart, promoting “Canada’s Picturesque East Coast” for Canadian Pacific.

See also
 List of lighthouses in Canada

References

External links 
 Aids to Navigation Canadian Coast Guard
 Official website for Cape Forchu Lightstation
 Cape Forchu info from Yarmouth.org
 Cape Forchu Lighthouse info from Lorneslights.com
 Aids to Navigation Canadian Coast Guard

Lighthouses in Nova Scotia
Museums in Yarmouth County
Maritime museums in Nova Scotia
Tourist attractions in Yarmouth County
Parks in Nova Scotia
Lighthouse museums in Canada
Lighthouses on the Canadian Register of Historic Places